Francesco Tontori, C.R.S. or Francesco Tontolo (died 1663) was a Roman Catholic prelate who served as Bishop of Ischia (1638–1663).

Biography
Francesco Tontori was ordained a priest in the Ordo Clericorum Regularium a Somascha.
On 15 January 1638, he was appointed during the papacy of Pope Urban VIII as Bishop of Ischia.
On 24 January 1638, he was consecrated bishop by Francesco Maria Brancaccio, Cardinal-Priest of Santi XII Apostoli, with Alfonso Gonzaga, Titular Archbishop of Rhodus, and Biago Proto de Rubeis, Archbishop of Messina, serving as co-consecrators. 
He served as Bishop of Ischia until his death in 1663.
While bishop, he was the principal co-consecrator of Ludovico Ridolfi, Bishop of Patti (1649).

References

External links and additional sources
 (for Chronology of Bishops) 
 (for Chronology of Bishops) 

17th-century Italian Roman Catholic bishops
Bishops appointed by Pope Urban VIII
1663 deaths
Somascan bishops